Sorbus decora, commonly known as the northern mountain ash, showy mountain-ash, or dogberry, is a deciduous shrub or very small tree native to northeastern North America. It occurs throughout the Laurentian Mixed Forest Province, the New England-Acadian forest region, and the eastern Canadian boreal forests.

Description
Its leaves are odd-pinnately compound, with 11–17 leaflets. All parts are hairless to slightly hairy.

Similar species
Showy mountain-ash is very similar to the closely related American mountain-ash (Sorbus americana). Like the American mountain-ash, the showy mountain-ash has odd-pinnately compound leaves and often large clusters of flowers and fruits. Showy mountain-ash can be distinguished by its shiny, sticky buds, and its slightly larger flowers and fruit. It is said to bloom a week earlier.

Uses 
It is often cultivated as an ornamental plant for its cold-hardiness, its attractive flowers, and its large clusters of small red berry-like pomes.

The fruits are an important source of food for wildlife, particularly birds in the winter and early spring.

References

External links 
Sorbus decora Information
Sorbus decora Info
 Interactive Distribution Map for Sorbus decora

decora
Flora of Ontario
Trees of Eastern Canada
Trees of the North-Central United States
Trees of the Northeastern United States
Flora without expected TNC conservation status